Seher Latif (died 7 June 2021) or Seher Aly Latif was an Indian producer and casting director, who worked on a number of domestic and international film projects based in India. Her credits as a casting director including award-winning films such as The Lunchbox, Shakuntala Devi, and the Indian casting for Zero Dark Thirty, Eat Pray Love, and The Second Best Exotic Marigold Hotel, as well as television shows such as Sense8, and McMafia. She also produced the Indian romantic television series, Bhaag Beanie Bhaag, starring Swara Bhasker. In 2016, Elle Magazine listed her as one of the 'most powerful young Indian women in Bollywood'.

Career 
Latif worked primarily as a casting director, often collaborating with international film and television projects to cast Indian actors for scenes filmed in India. Variety described her as " one of the most sought-after casting directors for international projects set in India or with a significant India component." She worked on a number of well-received international projects that were filmed partly in India, including Kathryn Bigelow's Zero Dark Thirty, John Madden'sThe Best Exotic Marigold Hotel, Ryan Murphy's Eat Pray Love, and The Hundred-Foot Journey. In addition to her work in film, she also did casting for a number of television series that were filmed in or relating to India, including Sense8, McMafia, and The Good Karma Hospital. In 2013, along with Mark Bennett and Richard Hicks, she was nominated for an award for Big Budget/Feature Casting for her work on Zero Dark Thirty, by the Casting Society of America.

In India, Latif was the casting director for The Lunchbox, which won several domestic and international awards. More recently, she worked as a producer for Shakuntala Devi, a biographical film about the Indian mathematician Shakuntala Devi, starring Vidya Balan, as well as on Bhaag Beanie Bhaag, an Indian romantic television series for Netflix that starred Swara Bhasker. Bhaag Beanie Bhaag was a production of Mutant Studios, a production studio set up by Latif and Shivani Saran in 2016. They also produced a sports drama, GOLD, starring Akshay Kumar, in 2018. Other recent work included casting on a biopic of mathematician Srinivasa Ramanujan, titled The Man Who Knew Infinity and starring Dev Patel, a period film, Viceroy's House, directed by Gurinder Chadha, and a horor-drama, Durgamati, starring Bhumi Pednekar. In 2016, Elle Magazine listed her as one of the 'most powerful young Indian women in Bollywood'.

Filmography 
Latif's filmography included credits for casting and production.

Casting

Production

Personal life 
Her alma mater- Mater Dei School, New Delhi. Latif died at the age of 39, in Mumbai, on 7 June 2021.

References 

Hindi cinema
Indian casting directors
Women casting directors
Indian film producers
Indian women film producers